Hermine de Graaf (13 March 1951 – 24 November 2013) was a Dutch novelist. De Graaf studied Dutch language and literature at the University of Amsterdam and worked as a teacher in Venray. Her debut as a writer was in 1984 with the publication of Een kaart, niet het gebied, a collection of ten short stories. In 1988 De Graaf won the Ferdinand Bordewijk Prijs for her novel De regels van het huis.

References

1951 births
2013 deaths
Ferdinand Bordewijk Prize winners
People from Oldambt (municipality)
20th-century Dutch novelists
Dutch women novelists
20th-century women writers
20th-century Dutch women